Events in the year 2022 in the Federated States of Micronesia.

Incumbents
President: David W. Panuelo
Vice President
Yosiwo George (until 13 August)
Aren Palik (from 13 September)

Events
Ongoing — COVID-19 pandemic in Oceania

February 
25 February – The FSM severed all diplomatic relations with the Russian Federation due to the "unjustified and brutal invasion of Ukraine". The Office of the President maintained that diplomatic relations will be entertained once Russia demonstrates its commitments to world peace, friendship, and common humanity instead of war and conflicts. Thus, the diplomatic relations count for the FSM fell down to 88 UN states.

March 
2 March – The FSM voted on a United Nations resolution condemning Russia for its invasion of Ukraine.

Deaths

References

 
2020s in the Federated States of Micronesia
Years of the 21st century in the Federated States of Micronesia
Micronesia
Micronesia